Each year the Miss Iowa Basketball award is given to the person chosen as the best high school girls' basketball player in the state of Iowa, in the United States.

The award has been given since 1981. Winners were chosen by the Iowa Newspaper Association at the time of its annual All-State selections until 2018. The Iowa Print Sports Writers Association now selects the award using the same format.
From 1990 to 1993, two awards were given, one for a 5-on-5 player and one for a 6-on-6 player, when girls in Iowa played in the two systems based on division.  Prior to 1990 award winners played 6-on-6 basketball, and since 1993, award winners have played 5-on-5 basketball.

Voting is done on a points system.  Each voter selects first, second, and third-place votes.  A player receives five points for each first-place vote, three points for each second-place vote, and one point for a third-place vote.  The player who receives the most points receives the award.

Award winners

Schools with multiple winners

References

Mr. and Miss Basketball awards
Awards established in 1981
Women's sports in Iowa
Basketball players from Iowa
Miss Basketball
Lists of American sportswomen
American women's basketball players
Miss Basketball